Mohavacris is a genus of desert long-horned grasshoppers in the family Tanaoceridae. There is one described species in Mohavacris, M. timberlakei.

References

Further reading

 

Caelifera
Articles created by Qbugbot
Monotypic Orthoptera genera